was a Japanese breaststroke swimmer. In 1935 he set a world record in the 200 m. Next year he won the gold medal in this event at the 1936 Olympics, setting a new Olympic record at 2:41.5. Hamuro swam the traditional breaststroke, while some of his competitors used the butterfly stroke, which was allowed at the time. Between 1935 and 1940 Hamuro never lost a race and won ten national breaststroke titles. After World War II he worked for the Mainichi newspaper as a sports journalist. In 1990, he was inducted into the International Swimming Hall of Fame.

Hamuro's wife was also a swimmer and a world champion in the masters category.

See also
 List of members of the International Swimming Hall of Fame

References

1917 births
2005 deaths
Olympic gold medalists for Japan
Sportspeople from Fukuoka (city)
Olympic swimmers of Japan
Swimmers at the 1936 Summer Olympics
Medalists at the 1936 Summer Olympics
Japanese male breaststroke swimmers
Olympic gold medalists in swimming
20th-century Japanese people